Santos Amador Quispe (born April 6, 1982, in Santa Cruz de la Sierra) is a Bolivian professional footballer currently playing for Nacional Potosí in Bolivia. He plays as a defender and has played for San José, Guabirá, Real Potosí and Wilstermann, all in Bolivia. He also won a national title in 2007. Agent Player Argentine Marcos Garzia (Garziafutbol).

External links
 Santos Amador's profile
 Other Santos Amador's profile
 

1982 births
Living people
Sportspeople from Santa Cruz de la Sierra
Bolivian footballers
Bolivia international footballers
Association football defenders
Club San José players
Club Real Potosí players
C.D. Jorge Wilstermann players
The Strongest players
Guabirá players
Nacional Potosí players
2011 Copa América players
Club Petrolero managers